"To Be with You" is a song by American rock band Mr. Big, released in November 1991 as the second single from their second album, Lean into It (1991). The ballad reached number one on the US Billboard Hot 100 for three weeks and topped the charts in 11 other countries, including Australia, Canada, Germany, and New Zealand.

Background and writing
The song was written and composed by Eric Martin during his teen years, with guitarist Paul Gilbert contributing to its melodic arrangements later on. Writing credit is also given to David Grahame, a songwriter working for the label at the time. The lyrics were inspired by a girl Martin knew when he was younger: "This girl had a lot of boyfriends who treated her like shit. I wanted to be the knight in shining armor, wanted to be with her. She wasn't having it. It never came to play."

While in Gilbert's apartment at Yucca Street in L.A., he and Martin were laying out their compositions. Martin had a ballad called "To Be with You". Gilbert had his psychedelic rock song called "Green Tinted Sixties Mind". Both felt the two songs were strong enough to be included in their upcoming album, despite it being purely rock; and true enough, these songs remained throughout the course of their career as a group and as solo artists. 

Originally, "To Be with You" was not intended to be released as a single. But after it out of the blue started getting radio play, they had to release it. The band's Billy Sheehan told in an 1992 interview, "We never intended to release 'To Be With You'. We had another single. But some guy in Lincoln, Neb., just started playing the song, and the record started selling like crazy. It spread to Omaha and went all over the country."

Critical reception
Stephen Thomas Erlewine from AllMusic described the song as a "campfire-singalong ballad". Larry Flick from Billboard noted that "headbangers get folky on this harmonious strummer". He added that "hand-clapping, sing-along chorus entices, while front man Eric Martin's voice has rarely sounded sweeter". DeVaney and Clark from Cashbox called it "an unplugged, acoustic guitar and harmony sing-along single". They also said that Martin "sounds like the quintessential rocker and is backed by some excellent non-electric guitar-picking by guitarist Paul Gilbert, managing to sound very adept without an electric drill for a pick". Janiss Garza from Entertainment Weekly felt that "this simple little ballad" is by far the best song on the Lean into It album. Jonathan Bernstein from Spin wrote, "In a year sadly lacking in palpable power ballads, these third-raters rode their Trojan horse to pole position with one of the always-spineless genre's most puny entries, "To Be with You"."

Music video
The accompanying music video for the song was directed by Nancy Bennett and features the band performing in a railroad car. The video changes from black and white to color around the halfway mark. Billy Sheehan told in an interview, "Even our video was done way-super-ultra-cheap. When we tell people how much we spent on the video, they can't believe it. We got this video together dirt cheap. To see it beating up Michael Jackson's million-dollar extravaganza on MTV is pretty amazing."

Track listings
 7-inch single
 "To Be with You" (LP version) (3:27)
 "Green-Tinted Sixties Mind" (LP version) (3:30)
			
 12-inch maxi
 "To Be with You"
 "A Little Too Loose" (live)
 "The Drill Song (Daddy, Brother, Lover, Little Boy)" (live)
 "Alive and Kickin'" (live)

 CD maxi
 "To Be with You" (3:27)
 "Green-Tinted Sixties Mind" (3:30)
 "Alive and Kickin'" (5:28)

Personnel
 Eric Martin – lead vocals
 Paul Gilbert – acoustic guitar, handclaps, backing vocals
 Billy Sheehan – bass guitar, handclaps, bass drum, backing vocals
 Pat Torpey – tambourine, bass drum, handclaps, backing vocals

Charts

Weekly charts

Year-end charts

Decade-end charts

Certifications

Release history

Westlife version
Irish boy band Westlife recorded a cover of the song and released it on their Turnaround album in 2003 and performed it live subsequently. It was also performed in their 2003 Unbreakable Tour.

References

External links
 Official Website

1991 songs
1991 singles
1990s ballads
Mr. Big (American band) songs
American soft rock songs
Atlantic Records singles
Billboard Hot 100 number-one singles
Black-and-white music videos
Dutch Top 40 number-one singles
European Hot 100 Singles number-one singles
Number-one singles in Australia
Number-one singles in Austria
Number-one singles in Belgium
Number-one singles in Denmark
Number-one singles in Germany
Number-one singles in New Zealand
Number-one singles in Norway
Number-one singles in Sweden
Number-one singles in Switzerland
Rock ballads
RPM Top Singles number-one singles
Westlife songs
Glam metal ballads